Gudi may refer to:
 Gudi, a term for a Hindu temple
 Gudi (instrument), a type of ancient Chinese flute 
 Gudi, Iran, a village in Hormozgan Province, Iran
 The gudi, a symbol associated with the Hindi new year
 Gudi Gantalu (Temple bells) is a 1964 Telugu film
Gudi, Abuloma, Port Harcourt, one of the names of the original 12 Houses that make up Abuloma Kingdom in Port Harcourt, Rivers State, Nigeria